The Arco lamp is a modern overhead lamp designed by brothers Pier Giacomo and Achille Castiglioni for Flos in 1962. The lamp is characterized by a suspended spun aluminum pendant attached to an upright slab of Carrara marble via a large, arching arm made of stainless steel.

The lamp has been in constant production since its original release in 1962.

History

Intellectual property case 
In November 2006, Flos brought charges against Semeraro Casa & Famiglia SpA, claiming that the company had violated copyright law in selling a similar lamp named "Fluida." Advocate General Yves Bot deemed that while the Fluida lamp was created in imitation of the original Arco design, production of the product was legal as the original design had since entered the public domain.

Following the 2001 implementation of the Directive on the legal protection of designs, Bot ordered Semeraro to cease production of the Fluida lamp.

References 

Italian design
Types of lamp
Products introduced in 1962